Chi Tau was a local fraternity at Chico State University that landed in the media spotlight following the 2005 hazing death of Matthew Carrington.

Fraternity history
Chi Tau was founded as a local chapter in May 1939, existing as an unaffiliated organization for seventeen years. Its early mission statement was,"To build character and to create a stronger feeling of brotherhood through tolerance." The 1940 yearbook notes that the name was derived from the words "character" and "tolerance."

Seeking a national connection it became Delta Alpha chapter of Delta Sigma Phi on May 20, 1956.  Alumni from the chapter operating as a governing board purchased a home for the chapter in 1991.

In 2001, due to a series of alcohol violations the chapter was suspended by Delta Sigma Phi headquarters, and at the same time expelled from the university - this action also taken for alcohol violations.  The chapter decided to continue to operate as a rogue (unsanctioned, unrecognized) fraternity, reverting to its original (local) name of Chi Tau.  Alumni members from the Delta Alpha era continued to own the group's house, located on West Fourth Street, the same house which had been purchased by the control board in 1991.

By Fall of 2003, within two years of the group's "going local," the Interfraternity Council (IFC) at Chico State pushed for the city to remove the group's Greek letters from the front of their house.  They explained that the Chi Tau organization was giving other, legitimate, Greek groups on campus a bad reputation and they wanted to distance themselves from a troublesome group.  The local fraternity was known for parties, alcohol, and violence because, since its expulsion as a recognized organization, it was not held to the policies or standards of other nationally-affiliated groups.  Hence, other Greek organizations wanted to strip the "XT" letters from the house in a measure to prevent community members from associating Chi Tau with these other recognized Greek organizations.  For its part, the local Chi Tau chapter was no longer interested in regaining affiliation with Delta Sigma Phi because they felt they would be restricted by Delta Sig policies and would not benefit from a relationship with the national organization.

Hazing death
In 2004, the following year, twenty-one year old Matthew Carrington transferred to Chico State to start classes that Fall as a transfer student from Diablo Valley College.  He was studying management information systems, and was asked to pledge Chi Tau by his friend Mike Quintana.  The two men began their pledgeship that same Fall.

By late 2004 or early 2005, towards the end of the several-month pledge process, Carrington indicated to friends that he was tired of pledging and his grades were beginning to suffer from it.  Yet he continued. Chi Tau forced the pledges to spend the final week, known by the fraternity as "Inspiration Week," or more commonly by the pledges as "Hell Week", in the basement of the fraternity house.  The 10-foot by 20-foot basement was a cold, damp room littered with cigarette butts and writing on the walls, including the phrase "In the basement, no one can hear you scream."

Day 1
Matt's week of living in the basement began on 30 January 2005.  On that same day, a sewer line in the house had burst, flooding the basement with several inches of sewage contaminated water. Pledges were forced to do push-ups and sit-ups in the sewage and sleep in small cubby holes that had been cut into the basement wall.

Day 2
The "Pledge Olympics" got underway around 11PM.  Pledges were forced to run up and down the stairs and play Wiffleball inside the house. Due to extremely cold conditions, they were allowed to sleep in the main portion of the house instead of the basement.

Day 3
The events of Tuesday, February 1 would last into the early hours of Wednesday morning. Carrington and Quintana were instructed to stand on one foot on a wooden bench, wearing only T-shirts, jeans, and socks, while Chi Tau members quizzed them on fraternity history.  If an incorrect answer was given, they were told to drink as much water as possible from a five-gallon Alhambra bottle or do push-ups on the floor.  Cold water was also poured on them while being blasted by fans.  They had to ask permission to urinate on themselves and were eventually told to take their shirts off with basement temperatures in the 30s.  Near 2AM, active Chi Tau members, Gabriel Maestretti, John Paul Fickes and James DeVilla Abrille, arrived at the house after a night of heavy drinking. Maestretti passed out on a couch in the basement. At around 2:30AM, the pledges, already in poor condition, were told they were done.  However, Maestretti woke up and decided he would take over the initiation event instead of allowing the pledges to leave the basement or sleep. Fickes and Abrille joined in on the events that would follow.  They ignored other members of the fraternity who came down to the basement on two occasions and told the three to stop. At one point Carrington dropped the five-gallon bottle and spilled water on one of the three actives. He was forced to do more push-ups as punishment.

Carrington collapsed around 3:40AM and went into a seizure that lasted nearly one minute. Chi Tau members changed Carrington out of his wet clothing and laid him on the couch after wrapping him in a sleeping bag.  Quintana noticed that Carrington had stopped breathing around 5AM. He performed CPR on Carrington until paramedics arrived and transported him to Enloe Medical Center, where he died soon after arrival that early morning on Wednesday, February 2, 2005.  The official cause of death was cardiac dysrhythmia and cerebral edema, or brain-swelling, due to water intoxication. Hypothermia also contributed to the death.

Aftermath

In response to the death of Carrington, California passed Matt's Law, which allowed for felony prosecutions of hazing deaths. Prior to the passing of Matt's Law, crimes stemming from hazing were only prosecutable as misdemeanors.

Due to the passage of Matt's Law, the death of Carrington resulted in the first felony charges brought for hazing in the United States. Gabriel John Maestretti pleaded guilty to involuntary manslaughter, James DeVilla Abrille pleaded guilty to misdemeanor hazing, and Jerry Ming Lim and John Paul Fickes both pleaded guilty to being accessories to involuntary manslaughter. All four men were given jail sentences ranging from 90 days to one year, with Maestretti given the longest sentence of one year. At his sentencing, Maestretti said, "I did what I did out of a misguided sense of building brotherhood, and instead I lost a brother. I will live with the consequences of hazing for the rest of my life. My actions killed a good person, and I will be a felon for the rest of my life, and I'll have to live with that disability, but I'm alive and Matt's not."

After Carrington's death, Chico State University temporarily placed all Greek recruitment on suspension.

Chi Tau was shut down, and its building was sold.

References

Sources 

Korry, Elaine. "A Fraternity Hazing Gone Wrong" Nov-2005; viewed Apr-2008 
Vega Cecilia M. Chronicle Staff Writer. "Horrifying details in hazing death Police arrest 5 – Chico State may abolish fraternities." Friday, March 4, 2005. viewed Apr-2005.
Dateline NBC, Chico hazing death video. June 24, 2005. viewed Apr-2008 

Defunct fraternities and sororities
Student societies in the United States